"Rakt in i kaklet" is a song by the Swedish duo Samir & Viktor. The song was released in Sweden as a digital download on 3 November 2017. The song peaked at number 44 on the Swedish Singles Chart.

Music video
A music video to accompany the release of "Rakt in i kaklet" was first released onto YouTube on 2 November 2017 at a total length of three minutes and twelve seconds.

Track listing

Charts

Release history

References

2017 songs
2017 singles
Samir & Viktor songs
Warner Music Group singles